"The Red Guards' March" (Finnish: "") is a Finnish working class song. It is one of the best known songs of the "Reds" during the Finnish Civil War in 1918, but was actually sung already before the war. Even though the lyrics for the march were written in Finnish, the melody has been taken from two Swedish and German folk songs. The writer of the lyrics is unknown.

References

Finnish Civil War
Social history of Finland
Labour movement
Finnish songs